Edmond Picard (15 December 1836 – 19 February 1924) was a Belgian jurist and writer. He was nominated for the Nobel Prize in Literature five times.

Career 

He was lawyer at the court of appeal and the Court of Cassation of Belgium. He was also head of the Belgian bar association, professor of law, playwright and journalist. Involved in politics, he was senator for the Belgian Labour Party. He also was a patron of the arts.

References

External links
 

19th-century Belgian writers
Belgian male writers
Belgian jurists
Belgian journalists
Male journalists
1836 births
1924 deaths
Members of the Senate (Belgium)
Belgian Labour Party politicians
19th-century male writers
Belgian magazine founders